JWT may refer to:
 James Webb Space Telescope
 JWt (Java web toolkit), a software library
 J. Walter Thompson, an advertising agency
 JSON Web Token, a metadata standard